Boiga is a large genus of rear-fanged, mildly venomous snakes, known commonly as cat-eyed snakes or simply cat snakes, in the family Colubridae. Species of the genus Boiga are native to southeast Asia, India, and Australia, but due to their extremely hardy nature and adaptability, have spread to many other suitable habitats around the world. There are 38 recognized species in the genus. According to the study done by Jiří Smíd regarding Old World cat snakes, the ancestor of the cat snake originated in Africa, from where it diversified and expanded to other countries. Despite this diversity however, the different species have very similar needs in terms of temperature and precipitation.

Species and subspecies

The following species and subspecies are recognized as being valid.
Boiga andamanensis  – Andaman cat snake
Boiga angulata  – Leyte cat snake
Boiga barnesii  – Barnes' cat snake
Boiga beddomei  – Beddome's cat snake
Boiga bengkuluensis 
Boiga blandingii  – Blanding's tree snake
Boiga bourreti 
Boiga ceylonensis  – Sri Lanka cat snake
Boiga cyanea  – green cat snake
Boiga cynodon  – dog-toothed cat snake
Boiga dendrophila  – gold-ringed cat snake, mangrove snake
Boiga dendrophila annectens 
Boiga dendrophila dendrophila 
Boiga dendrophila divergens 
Boiga dendrophila gemmicincta 
Boiga dendrophila latifasciata 
Boiga dendrophila levitoni 
Boiga dendrophila multicincta 
Boiga dendrophila occidentalis 
Boiga dightoni  – Pirmad cat snake
Boiga drapiezii  – white-spotted cat snake
Boiga flaviviridis 
Boiga forsteni  – Forsten's cat snake
Boiga gocool  – arrowback tree snake
Boiga guangxiensis 
Boiga hoeseli 
Boiga irregularis  – brown tree snake
Boiga jaspidea  – jasper cat snake
Boiga kraepelini  – Kelung cat snake
Boiga melanota 
Boiga multifasciata  – many-banded cat snake
Boiga multomaculata  – many-spotted cat snake
Boiga nigriceps  – black-headed cat snake
Boiga nuchalis  – collared cat snake
Boiga ochracea  – tawny cat snake
Boiga philippina  – Philippine cat snake
Boiga quincunciata 
Boiga ranawanei  – Ranawana’s cat snake
Boiga saengsomi  – banded cat snake
Boiga schultzei  – Schultze's blunt-headed tree snake
Boiga siamensis  – gray cat snake
Boiga tanahjampeana 
Boiga thackerayi  – Thackeray’s cat snake
Boiga trigonata  – Indian gamma snake
Boiga trigonata trigonata 
Boiga trigonata melanocephala 
Boiga wallachi  – Nicobar cat snake
Boiga westermanni  – Indian egg-eating snake
Boiga whitakeri  – Whitaker's cat snake

Nota bene: A binomial authority in parentheses indicates that the species was original described in a genus other than Boiga.

Description
They vary greatly in pattern and color. Many species have banding, but some are spotted and some are solid-colored. Colors are normally black, brown, or green with white or yellow accents.

Behaviour
Snakes of the genus Boiga are primarily arboreal, nocturnal snakes.

Diet
Snakes of the genus Boiga  prey on various small species of lizards, snakes, birds, and mammals.

Venom
The toxicity of Boiga venom varies from species to species, but is not generally considered to be life-threatening to humans.
Since their venom doesn't usually harm humans, they are popular exotic pets.

Reproduction
Boiga species are oviparous.

In captivity
Boiga dendrophila is by far the most common species in captivity, but B. cyanea and B. nigriceps are also found. Nowadays, B. cynodon, B. philippina and a “Katherine morph” of B. irregularis are also circulating in the South-East Asian exotic pet trade. Others are not commonly available. They are hardy and adaptable and tend to do well in captivity after the initial period of stress from the importation process is passed. They are not bred commonly in captivity, so most specimens available are wild caught, and thus are prone to heavy internal parasite load. Adjusting them to a rodent only diet can be difficult for the inexperienced reptile keeper.

Invasive species
Boiga irregularis in particular has been federally banned in the United States because of its effect by accidentally being introduced to the island of Guam. Some time during the 1950s, some B. irregularis of both sexes (or possibly a single female with eggs) reached the island, possibly having hidden in imported plant pots. The island of Guam lacks native snakes or predators that can deal with snakes the size and aggressiveness of B. irregularis. As a result, it has bred unchecked as an invasive species, and has begun consuming the island's bird life in extreme numbers. Dozens of bird species have been completely eradicated from the island, many species that were found nowhere else on earth, and the snake has reached astonishing population densities, reported to be as high as 15,000 snakes per square mile. In addition to devouring the native fauna, this species will routinely crawl into power transformers, and this typically results in both an electrocuted snake and substantial blackouts.

References

Further reading
Fitzinger LI (1826). Neue Classification der Reptilien nach ihren natürlichen Verwandtschaften. Nebst einer Verwandtschafts-tafel und einem Verzeichnisse der Reptilien-Sammlung des k.k. zoologischen Museums zu Wien. Vienna: J.G. Heubner. five unnumbered + 67 pp. + one plate. (Boiga, new genus, p. 60). (in German and Latin).

External links
Wild Herps.com: Eastern Brown Tree Snake
Gernot-Vogel.de: Checklist of the Genus Boiga (Serpentes: Colubridae)

Boiga
Colubrids
Snakes of Australia
Reptiles of India
Reptiles of Asia
Reptiles of Pakistan
Snake genera
Taxa named by Leopold Fitzinger